This is about the music album. For the Filipino novel, see More Than Conquerors (novel).

More Than Conquerors is the fourth full-length album by San Diego punk band Dogwood. It is their first to be released on Tooth & Nail Records. The title is a reference to the Bible passage Romans, chapter 8, verse 37; "Nay, in all these things we are more than conquerors through Him that loved us."

Track listing
 "Suffer"
 "Rest Assured"
 "Feel The Burn"
 "Never Die"
 "Out Of The Picture"
 "My Best Year"
 "Control"
 "Everything Dies In Time"
 "We Cry Victory"
 "The Pain Is Gone"
 "Confusion Zero"
 "Left Out Cold"
 "More Than Conquerors"

References

Dogwood (band) albums
1999 albums
Tooth & Nail Records albums